Staley Da Bear is the official mascot of the Chicago Bears of the National Football League. He is an anthropomorphic bear with a customized team jersey. Staley's name is eponymous to A. E. Staley, who founded the Bears’ franchise in 1919. 

He debuted during the 2003 Chicago Bears season to entertain fans at Soldier Field. He has since participated in many charity events, parties, Chicago Rush games, and other Bears-related events. Staley has also made numerous cameos on television, especially during the team's Super Bowl run in 2006. Through , Staley's winning percentage with the Bears is .537. Staley was named a three-time Pro Bowl mascot in 2004, 2006 and 2007. At halftime, Staley and his "furballs" (NFL mascots and various other mascots) would take on a group of youth players from Naperville. Staley also frequently attends annual holiday parties hosted by the Bears. Staley has also appeared in the Elmhurst St. Patrick's Day Parade. Staley and other NFL mascots have also participated in Halloween events. Staley also visits area schools to promote and participate in anti-bullying assemblies and programs.

References

External links
Staley's Bio on the Chicago Bears website

Chicago Bears
National Football League mascots
Bear mascots
2003 establishments in Illinois